Shawlands Academy is a state secondary school in the Shawlands area of Glasgow, Scotland.

Admissions
Shawlands Academy was Glasgow's designated International School and one of Scotland's most multicultural schools.  It was situated in Shawlands, between Pollok Park (and its Burrell Collection) and Queen's Park.

Shawlands Academy had around 1,250 students and over 100 teachers.

Shawlands Academy dated from 1857 when there was a private school of the same name located nearby in Skirving Street. This private school became state-owned and was then called Crossmyloof Annexe.  It served as a feeder school for Shawlands Academy in the 1960s. The Shawlands Academy we know today opened its doors over 118 years ago in 1894 in the nearby building on Pollokshaws Road which now houses Shawlands Primary School.

Pluralism
Shawlands was noted for its pluralism.  In the 1960s, the school had a particularly high concentration of Jewish pupils, and was one of the few state schools in Scotland to offer Hebrew as a curriculum subject.  Reflecting its status as Glasgow International School, Shawlands taught many modern languages, including Urdu. According to a survey in 2006, over 50 languages were spoken in the playground.

Notable alumni 

Academia / Science / Fellowships
 Ronald Arnold – Regius Professor of Engineering at the University of Edinburgh
 Tom Husband – Vice Chancellor of the University of Salford
 Alexander Provan Robertson – chair in mathematics at Keele University and assisted in the founding of Murdoch University, Perth, Western Australia

Arts
 Ivor Cutler (born Isadore Cutler) – Poet and Songwriter
 Jack Milroy (a.k.a. James Cruden) – Comedian
 Jerry Sadowitz – Comedian and Magician
 Brian Limond – Comedian 
 Reay Tannahill (a.k.a. Annabel Laine) – Author
 Atta Yaqub – Model and Actor

Film and Theatre
 Michelle Gomez – Actress (Doctor Who, Green Wing)
 Eileen Herlie – Actress (1960 best actress nominee for Tony Award)
 Alex Norton – Actor (Taggart)
 Daniel Portman – Actor (River City, Game of Thrones)

Military
 Donald Cameron (VC) – Recipient of the Victoria Cross
 Archie McKellar – Recipient of the DFC and bar, and DSO, during the Battle of Britain

Music
 John Martyn (a.k.a. Ian David McGeachey) – Rock musician
 William Rogue (a.k.a. Stewart William Allan) – Rock musician
 Bobby Wellins – Tenor saxophonist

Notoriety
 Ian Brady (born Ian Duncan Stewart) – serial killer
 Aqsa Mahmood – ISIS recruiter
Politics
 James Craigen – Member of Parliament
 James Dickens OBE – Member of Parliament
 James Dunlop MacDougall – Political activist
 Maurice Miller – Member of Parliament
 Robert Nichol (British politician) – Member of Parliament
 John Robertson (Glasgow MP) – Member of Parliament
 Bill Wilson (Scottish politician) – Member of Scottish Parliament

Religion
 Hugh Wyllie – Moderator of the General Assembly of the Church of Scotland
 Bruce Morrison – Founder of the Free United Divided Presbyterian Church of Scotland

Sport
 John Bannerman, Baron Bannerman of Kildonan – Scottish rugby union international and politician
 Philippa York (a.k.a. Robert Millar) – Professional Cyclist
 Tommy Yule – Footballer

References

External links
 The school's website
 Shawlands Academy's page on Scottish Schools Online

Secondary schools in Glasgow
1857 establishments in Scotland
People educated at Shawlands Academy
Educational institutions established in 1857